CHOB-TV is a low-power community television station in Maskwacis, Alberta, Canada, which began broadcasting in 1997. The station was licensed by the Canadian Radio-television and Telecommunications Commission on July 10, 1997.

CHOB-TV, is owned and operated by a local television broadcaster, Samson Management Ltd (via their Cree Communications Group subsidiary), who also rebroadcasts a small selection of broadcast and cable channels via low-powered VHF/UHF translators. The station airs two hours per week of local programming, such as locally produced programming, news events and community updates, township council meetings, interviews, tournaments, and recreational activities. Samson Management Ltd is fully owned by the Samson Cree Nation.

References

External links
 
CHOB-TV history - Canadian Communication Foundation

HOB
HOB
Canadian community channels
First Nations mass media
Television channels and stations established in 1997
1997 establishments in Alberta
Indigenous television in Canada